A built-in hold is a period in a launch countdown where the countdown clock is stopped.  The hold serves as a milestone in the countdown and may be of a fixed or variable duration.  Criteria for exiting that hold and restarting the countdown may be based on a fixed time, completion of a checklist of work items, or a go/no-go decision from mission management.

For example, space shuttle launch countdowns included 7 holds at T-27 hours, T-19 hours, T-11 hours, T-6 hours, T-3 hours, T-20 minutes, and T-9 minutes.

References

NASA
Spaceflight